Nogometni klub Zarica Kranj, commonly referred to as NK Kranj or NK Zarica, is a Slovenian association football club based in the town of Kranj. They competes in the Upper Carniolan League, the fourth tier of the Slovenian football. The club was founded in 1974.

Honours
Slovenian Third League
Winners: 2014–15

Upper Carniolan League (fourth tier)
Winners: 2006–07

 MNZG-Kranj Cup
Winners: 2005–06

League history since 1991

References

External links
Official website 
Soccerway profile

1974 establishments in Slovenia
Association football clubs established in 1974
Football clubs in Slovenia
Football clubs in Yugoslavia
Sport in Kranj